Bradbury Greenleaf "B. G" Plumer (May 22, 1830 – July 22, 1886) was an American businessman, farmer, and politician.

Born in Epping, New Hampshire, Plumer took part in the California Gold Rush. He then moved to Saint Louis, Missouri. In 1854, Plumer moved to Wausau, Wisconsin and was involved in the lumber business. Plumer also farmed and raised cattle. In 1866, Plumer served in the Wisconsin State Assembly. His brother was Daniel L. Plumer, who also served in the Wisconsin State Assembly. He committed suicide with a firearm in Wausau, Wisconsin.

Notes

1830 births
1886 deaths
People from Epping, New Hampshire
Politicians from Wausau, Wisconsin
People of the California Gold Rush
Businesspeople from Wisconsin
Members of the Wisconsin State Assembly
American politicians who committed suicide
Suicides by firearm in Wisconsin
19th-century American politicians
19th-century American businesspeople
1880s suicides